John Watson Griffin (born November 2, 1939) is a former American football defensive back who played college football for Memphis State (1959–1962) and professional football for the Los Angeles Rams (1963), the Denver Broncos (1964–1966), and the BC Lions (1967–1968).

Early years
A native of Nashville, Tennessee, he attended East Nashville High School in that city. He then played college football as a defensive back and running back at Memphis from 1959 to 1962. He helped lead the 1962 Memphis State Tigers football team to an 8–1 record. At the end of the 1962 season, he was selected to play in the Senior Bowl and the Chicago College All-Star Game.

Professional football
He was drafted by the Los Angeles Rams with the 43rd pick in the 1963 NFL Draft. He played for the Rams during the 1963 season, appearing in 10 NFL games.

He later played in the American Football League (AFL) for the Denver Broncos from 1964 to 1966, appearing in 26 AFL games.

He finished his playing career in the Canadian Football League, playing for the BC Lions during the 1967 and 1968 seasons. He appeared in a total of 26 CFL games.

Later years
After his playing career ended, Griffin worked in sales from 1969 until his retirement in 2000. He also served as a scout for the Dallas Cowboys, Tampa Bay Buccaneers, and Montreal Alouettes. He was inducted into the University of Memphis Club Hall of Fame in 2004.

References

1939 births
Living people
American football defensive backs
Los Angeles Rams players
Memphis Tigers football players
Players of American football from Nashville, Tennessee